Auklandshamn or Økland is a village in Sveio municipality in Vestland county, Norway.  The village is located in the northern part of the traditional district of Haugaland, along the southern shore of the Bømlafjorden.  Historically, the area was part of the municipality of Finnås, but it was transferred to the municipality of Valestrand in 1870.  In 1964, it was transferred to the municipality of Sveio.

It has about 500 permanent residents. A primary school and a grocery shop are located in the village. There is limited industry and commerce except from the tourist and aquaculture industry. A large amount of the residents commute to the town of Haugesund to work or they work in offshore related industries. The population increases during the summer months due to a high share of vacation homes in the area.

Industry
The aquaculture industry is quite strong. The area is rich in fish, including cod and pollock which are the most common. In season a lot of mackerel and herring come into the harbor at Auklandshamn. The western coast area was traditionally covered with heather. In recent years, with little livestock on the moors, deciduous forests have grown up. Much of the forest, especially in the outer parts of the district, is relatively young.

Notable residents 
 Einar Vestvik, journalist
 Irene Jacobsen, journalist

References

External links
Auklandshamn village website

Villages in Vestland
Sveio